Theater Aachen is a theatre in Aachen, Germany. It is the principal venue in that city for operas, musical theatre and plays. It is the home of the Aachen Symphony Orchestra. The original project was by Johann Peter Cremer, later altered by Karl Friedrich Schinkel. Construction on the original theatre began in 1822 and it opened on 15 May 1825. A bomb attack on 14 July 1943 destroyed the first theatre, and the current structure was inaugurated on 23 December 1951 with a performance of Richard Wagner's Die Meistersinger von Nürnberg.

Conductors
The conductors of the theatre have also been Generalmusikdirektor of Aachen:
1920–1935 Peter Raabe
1935–1942 Herbert von Karajan
1942–1944 Paul van Kempen
1946–1953 Felix Raabe
1953–1958 Wolfgang Sawallisch
1958–1962 Hans Walter Kämpfel
1962–1974 Wolfgang Trommer
1974–1983 Gabriel Chmura
1984–1990 Yoram David
1990–1992 Bruce Ferden
1993–1996 Yukio Kitahara
1997–2002 Elio Boncompagni
2002–2012 Marcus Bosch
2012–2017 Kazem Abdullah
2017–2018 Justus Thorau
since 2018 Christopher Ward

External links
Official Website of Theater Aachen

Aachen
Opera houses in Germany
Theatres in North Rhine-Westphalia
Theatres completed in 1825
Music venues completed in 1825
Karl Friedrich Schinkel buildings